The World Painted Blood Tour was a concert tour by Slayer.

Gary Holt of Exodus was announced as guitarist Jeff Hanneman's temporary replacement on March 13, to April 4, 2011, and joined again on April 23, 2011.

Cannibal Corpse guitarist Pat O'Brien filled in for Holt when Holt left the European tour to play with his own band Exodus at the Estadio Nacional in Santiago, Chile on April 10, 2011. Holt's last show with Slayer was on April 4, 2011 in Padova, Italy, O'Brien joined the band for the April 6, 2011 show in Croatia, and finished the European Carnage dates on April 14, 2011 in the Netherlands.

The European Carnage Tour was co-headlined with Megadeth. This was the first time in 21 years since the Clash of the Titans tour in Europe with Testament and Suicidal Tendencies that Slayer and Megadeth had toured the continent together.

On the end of March, 2011, Slayer announced a U.S. and Canada tour with Rob Zombie and Exodus. The tour name is Hell on Earth 2011, started on July 20 and ended on August 6, 2011.

On April 23, Slayer was part of the first Big Four show in the United States. Hanneman rejoined to play the last two songs of the concert. It would be Hanneman's last performance with Slayer before his death in 2013.

Tour dates

 Big 4 shows with Metallica, Megadeth and Anthrax

Setlist

Typical World Painted Blood Setlist 

"World Painted Blood"
"Hate Worldwide"
"War Ensemble"
"Jihad"
"Expendable Youth"
"Disciple"
"Beauty Through Order"
"Dead Skin Mask"
"Hell Awaits"
"Payback"
"Mandatory Suicide"
"Chemical Warfare"
"Seasons in the Abyss"
"Ghosts of War"
"Aggressive Perfector"

Encore:

"South of Heaven"
"Raining Blood"
"Angel of Death"

Typical Hell on Earth Setlist

 "World Painted Blood"
"Hate Worldwide"
"War Ensemble"
 "Postmortem"
 "Dittohead"
 "Dead Skin Mask"
 "Spirit in Black"
 "Mandatory Suicide"
 "Chemical Warfare"
 "Silent Scream"
 "Seasons in the Abyss"
 "Snuff"

Encore:

 "South of Heaven"
 "Raining Blood"
 "Black Magic"
 "Angel of Death"

Personnel
Kerry King - guitars
Tom Araya - vocals, bass
Dave Lombardo - drums

Touring musicians
Gary Holt - guitars (February 26 - April 4, 2011; April 23 - November 6, 2011)
Pat O'Brien - guitars (April 6–14, 2011)

References

2011 concert tours
Slayer concert tours